Brantley Gilbert is an American country music artist. His discography consists of six studio albums—A Modern Day Prodigal Son (2009), Halfway to Heaven (2010), Just As I Am (2014), The Devil Don't Sleep (2017), Fire & Brimstone (2019), and So Help Me God (2022) He has also released a total of 17 singles, 5 of which hit number one on the US Country Airplay chart.

Studio albums

Compilation albums

Singles 

A "Kick It in the Sticks" did not enter the Hot 100, but charted at number 13 on Bubbling Under Hot 100, which acts as a 25-space extension of the Hot 100.
B "Stone Cold Sober" did not enter the Hot 100, but charted at number 8 on the Bubbling Under Hot 100, which acts as a 25-space extension of the Hot 100.
C "The Ones That Like Me" did not enter the Hot 100, but charted at number 16 on Bubbling Under Hot 100, which acts as a 25-space extension of the Hot 100.

Featured singles

Other charted songs

Music videos

Notes

References

Country music discographies
 
 
Discographies of American artists